Michael John Dalton (23 May 1875 – 12 July 1933) was an Australian rules footballer who played with St Kilda in the Victorian Football League (VFL).

References

External links 

1875 births
1933 deaths
Australian rules footballers from Victoria (Australia)
St Kilda Football Club players